Gondek-e Hasan (also Romanized as Gondek-e Ḩasan) is a village in Gazin Rural District, Raghiveh District, Haftgel County, Khuzestan Province, Iran. At the 2006 census, its population was 280, in 55 families.

References 

Populated places in Haftkel County